The 1934 Tour de France was the 28th edition of the Tour de France, taking place from 3 to 29 July. The race was won by Antonin Magne, who had previously won the 1931 Tour de France. The French team was dominant, holding the yellow jersey for the entire race and winning most of the stages. Every member of the French team won at least one stage.

French cyclist René Vietto rose to prominence by winning the mountains classification, but even more by giving up his own chances for the Tour victory by giving first his front wheel and later his bicycle to his team captain Magne.

The 1934 Tour de France saw the introduction of the split stage and the individual time trial. Stage 21 was split into two parts, and the second part was an individual time trial, the first one in the history of the Tour de France.

Innovations and changes
The major introduction in 1934 was the introduction of the individual time trial (ITT). There had been time-trial like stages before in the Tour de France, but they had been run as a team time trial. Since the format of the Tour de France changed in 1930 from trade teams to national teams, the Tour organisation had to pay for the housing, travel and feeding for the cyclists. The organisation received the money from the sales of l'Auto, the newspaper that organised the Tour. l'Auto was a morning newspaper, while one of its competitors, Paris-Soir, was an evening paper. Paris-Soir was also following the race, and was able to publish the results the same day, while l'Auto had to wait for the next day, publishing old news. To counter this, the stages in the Tour de France had started later, so they would end after Paris-Soir had to print their newspapers.
The Paris-Soir sports editor had countered this by starting his own race, the Grand Prix des Nations, run as an ITT. The first edition in 1932 was not received well by the cyclists, but from 1933 on it was a success. The tour director Henri Desgrange saw the success of the French cyclists in the Grand Prix des Nations, and adapted the individual time trial format in the Tour.
Not all cyclists were happy with the ITT. René Vietto, a climber, said it was a dull test of horsepower, while a bike race should also test the head. Other cyclists said the ITT would negate the effect of good teamwork.

The bonification system from the 1933 Tour de France was slightly reduced: now the winner of a stage received 90 seconds bonification, and the second cyclist 45 seconds. In addition to this, the winner of the stage received a bonification equal to the difference between him and the second-placed cyclists, with a maximum of two minutes. This same bonification system was applied on mountain summits that counted for the mountains classification.

In 1933, there had been 40 touriste-routiers, cyclist not competing in a national team, but in 1934 this was reduced to 20. In previous years, these touriste-routiers had to supply their own material and arrange their own hotels; in 1934, the conditions improved and touriste-routiers were given the same treatment as the riders in national teams.

Teams

As was the custom since the 1930 Tour de France, the 1934 Tour de France was contested by national teams. Belgium, Italy, Germany and France each sent teams of 8 cyclists each, while Switzerland and Spain sent a combined team of eight cyclists. In addition, there were 20 individual cyclists; other than in 1933, they were no longer racing under the nomer "touriste-routier" but as "individuel". In total this made 60 cyclists.

Pre-race favourites
The French team of 1934 consisted of all good riders, with the core of the team being the winner of 1933, Georges Speicher, Roger Lapébie, former winner Antonin Magne and Maurice Archambaud, who had performed well in 1933. The French selectors were criticized for selecting René Vietto, a twenty-year-old rider who had only won some small races. The Italian team now included Giuseppe Martano, who had ridden as a touriste-routier in 1933. The Belgian team, which normally included some big contenders, was lackluster.

Route and stages

Race overview

The first stage was won by 1933 winner Speicher, and again wore the yellow jersey. In the second stage, he lost his lead as there was a split, with Speicher in the second part and Magne in the leading group, and Magne took over the leading position.

In the fifth stage, Le Grevès and Speicher finished close together. After examining the photo finish, both cyclists shared the time bonus, although Le Grevès was named winner.

After stage six, before the heavy climbing in the alps, Magne was leading with almost 8 minutes on second-placed Martano. In the alps, Vietto was the best. He won stages 7 and 9, and climbed to third place in the general classification, half an hour behind Magne. Had he not lost 40 minutes in the first two stages due to flat tires, he would have been the leader of the race. Martano had been able to reduce the margin to Magne to 125 seconds.

The stages 12 to 14, between the Alps and the Pyrenees, were won by French cyclists, without important changes in the general classification. In the fifteenth stage, Magne attacked on an early climb, but Martano did not drop. The big climb of the day was the Puymorens, and Vietto lead while Magne and Martano followed. On the way down, Magne crashed on a pothole, and broke the wooden rim of his front wheel. Martano saw his chances, and raced away. Magne asked Vietto for his bicycle, but Vietto only gave him his front wheel. Magne's frame had been bent in the crash, so when Speicher, the next French cyclist, showed up, Magne took Speicher's bicycle. Vietto had to wait several minutes to get a replacing front wheel, and lost all chances for the stage victory. A photographer was present to take a picture of Vietto, weeping with a bike without a front wheel. When this picture was published, the cycling world was touched, and newspapers proclaimed him "Le Roi René" (King René).

In the sixteenth stage, things got worse for Vietto. He was first over the first two mountains, with his team leader Magne and Martano closely following. On the descent of the Portet d'Aspet, Magne crashed again, and broke his rear wheel. Vietto was unaware of this, and continued. When he was down, a Tour course marshall informed him that his team leader had crashed. Lapébie was far ahead, and all the other French cyclists were far behind, so Magne was without support. Vietto then turned around, and rode back up the mountain. When he reached Magne, Magne took Vietto's bicycle. Magne rode down, reached Lapébie who had waited for him, and together they caught Martano. Vietto had to wait for the service car to bring him a new bicycle, and finally finished four minutes behind Magne, Martano and Lapébie.
Vietto was not happy with what had happened, and he said that Magne did not know how to ride, and that Lapébie should not have been so far ahead. Magne on the other hand was grateful for what Vietto and Lapébie did.

In the seventeenth stage, Magne was able to get away from Martano who broke his frame, and finished 13 minutes ahead of thim while winning the stage. Magne now lead with almost 20 minutes.
In the eighteenth stage, Magne lost four minutes to Martano. It could have been more, had not Vietto and Lapébie collected the time bonuses on the mountains and the finish.

In the next flat stages, nothing really changed the general classification except the individual time trial in stage 21. Magne won there, increasing the margin to Martano by 8 minutes. Vietto had won back enough time to end in fifth place in the general classification, and won the mountains classification. Magne had ridden consistently in the entire Tour, and had benefitted from his team support. He won his second Tour de France, the fifth in a row for France.

Classification leadership and minor prizes

The time that each cyclist required to finish each stage was recorded, and these times were added together for the general classification. If a cyclist had received a time bonus, it was subtracted from this total; all time penalties were added to this total. The cyclist with the least accumulated time was the race leader, identified by the yellow jersey.

For the mountains classification, 14 mountains were selected by the Tour organisation. On the top of these mountains, ten points were given for the first cyclist to pass, nine points to the second cyclist, and so on, until the tenth cyclist who got one point.

For the fifth time, there was a team competition, this time won by the French team. The team classification was calculated in 1934 by adding up the times of the best three cyclists of a team; the team with the least time was the winner. The fifth national team that started, the Belgian team, finished with only two cyclists, so according to the rules in 1934 they were no longer eligible for the team classification.

Fourth-placed Félicien Vervaecke became the winner of the "individuals" category. This classification was calculated in the same way as the general classification, but only the cyclists riding as individuals were eligible.

Final standings

General classification

Mountains classification

Team classification

Aftermath
The individual time trial that was introduced in 1934 was a success, and has been used since then in almost every year.

René Vietto, who had sacrificed his Tour chances for his team leader Magne, was convinced that he could have won the Tour instead.

Notes

References

Bibliography

External links

 
1934 in road cycling
1934 in French sport
1934
July 1934 sports events